Patricia Martin Bates  D.F.A. known as Pat Martin Bates (born June 25, 1927) is a Canadian artist and educator.

Biography
Born in Saint John, New Brunswick, Martin began her formal art studies at the age of 12 with Stanley Royale, who taught at Mount Allison University. Bates subsequently studied at the Académie Royale des Beaux-Arts and the Royal Academy of Fine Arts in Belgium, at the Sorbonne in Paris, and at the Pratt Graphic Art Center in New York. She married Al Bates in 1948.

She is a printmaker, noted for her embossing technique, and in the 1960s, became well known for her Plexiglas cube sculptures which incorporated print processes. Her work is often inspired by Occidental themes or religions. Bates was a member of the group in Victoria known as the Victoria Limners Society, a group of visual artists based in Victoria, B.C. (1971-2008). Bates played a role in the art community locally: she was the founder of what became XChanges Gallery and Studios in Victoria, a non-profit artists' cooperative operating a gallery and studios for practicing artists, among other initiatives.

Bates had many exhibitions, both nationally and internationally. In 1986, a exhibition of her work was shown in Vancouver. In 2005, a retrospective exhibition titled Pat Martin Bates: Destinations, Navigations, Illuminations was shown at the Art Gallery of Greater Victoria. In 2019, her a 50-year survey exhibition titled Inscape Golden Timeless Threads - Points of Starlight Silence was shown at the Victoria Arts Council as a special project in honour of the Council's 50th anniversary year.

From 1964 on, she was a professor at the University of Victoria and taught there for more than 30 years. In 1991, she received the University of Victoria Alumni Association annual award for teaching excellence. She received an Honorary Doctorate from the University of Victoria in 1994 for her years of service and achievements. Her work is included in the collections of the Art Gallery of Greater Victoria, the University of Victoria, the Art Gallery of Guelph, the National Gallery of Canada, the Museum of Modern Art in New York, and the Fine Arts Museums of San Francisco, among others.

She received the Queen’s Jubilee Medal, the Zachenta medal in Poland, the Global Graphics Award in Holland, the Gold Medal at the International Biennale of Prints and the International Print Art of Norway Gold Medal, and various awards from the Canada Council, as well as the Legacy Prize from Victoria. She was elected to the Royal Canadian Academy in 2008. The Canadian Federation of University Women Victoria honoured her by establishing, in 1985, the Pat Martin Bates Scholarship in Visual Arts.

Publications

References

1927 births
Artists from Saint John, New Brunswick
Canadian printmakers
Women printmakers
Academic staff of the University of Victoria
Mount Allison University alumni
Living people
Royal Academy of Fine Arts (Antwerp) alumni
21st-century Canadian women artists
Canadian art educators
20th-century Canadian educators
20th-century Canadian printmakers